Laugar is a village in the Northeastern Region Iceland, on the Reykjadalsá river, a left tributary of the Laxá í Aðaldal river. Route 1 runs through the village between Akureyri and Reykjahlíð. It is largest village in the municipality of Þingeyjarsveit. In 2018, it had a population of 109 people.

Laugar developed around thermal springs, hence its name, which in Icelandic means "hot springs". Laugar is located on the Diamond Circle tourist route. In its vicinity there are famous tourist attractions: Goðafoss waterfall (approx.  to the west) and lake Mývatn (approx.  to the southeast). However,  to the north of the village, there is lake Vestmannsvatn.

References

External links
Official website 

Populated places in Northeastern Region (Iceland)